Antonio Martín Espina (born June 18, 1966) is a Spanish retired professional basketball player. At a height of 2.10 m (6 ft 10 in), and a weight of 104 kg (230 lbs.), he played at the center position. He is the current president of the Spanish ACB.

College career
Martín played college basketball at Pepperdine University, with the Pepperdine Waves, during the 1986–87 season.

Professional career
After playing with Estudiantes, in the 1982–83 season, Martín moved to Real Madrid. He played with Real Madrid, for twelve years, from 1983, until 1995. He was a member of the FIBA European Selection team, in 1991.

National team career
Martín was a member of the senior Spain men's national team. With Spain, he won the bronze medal at the 1991 EuroBasket, where he was also voted to the EuroBasket All-Tournament Team.

After retirement
In July 2018, Martín was named the President of the Spanish ACB.

Personal life
His brother, Fernando Martín Espina, also played with Real Madrid.

Awards and accomplishments

Clubs (Real Madrid)
5× Spanish League Champion: (1983–84, 1984–85, 1985–86, 1992–93, 1993–94)
4× Spanish Cup Winner (1984–85, 1985–86, 1988–89, 1992–93)
3× FIBA European Cup Winners' Cup (FIBA Saporta Cup) Champion: (1983–84, 1988–89, 1991–92)
EuroLeague Champion: (1994–95)
FIBA Korać Cup Champion: (1987–88)

Spanish senior national team
EuroBasket 1991:

Individual
FIBA European Selection: 1991
EuroBasket All-Tournament Team: 1991

References

External links
 FIBA Profile
 FIBA Europe Profile
 Profile at ACB.com 
 Real Madrid Legends 

1966 births
Living people
Basketball players at the 1988 Summer Olympics
Pepperdine University alumni
CB Estudiantes players
Centers (basketball)
Liga ACB players
Olympic basketball players of Spain
Pepperdine Waves men's basketball players
Real Madrid Baloncesto players
Spanish expatriate basketball people in the United States
Spanish men's basketball players